The Journal of Energy Engineering is a quarterly peer-reviewed scientific journal published by the American Society of Civil Engineers. It covers civil engineering as related to the production, distribution, and storage of energy.

Abstracting and indexing
The journal is abstracted and indexed in Ei Compendex, Science Citation Index Expanded, ProQuest databases, Civil Engineering Database, Inspec, Scopus, and EBSCO databases.

History
The journal has been known by several names:
Journal of the Power Division (1956-1978)
Journal of the Energy Division (1979-1982)
Journal of Energy Engineering (1983-present)

External links

Civil engineering journals
American Society of Civil Engineers academic journals
Publications established in 1956